Wortendyke is a former commuter railroad train station in the borough of Midland Park, Bergen County, New Jersey. The station serviced passenger and freight trains of the New York, Susquehanna and Western Railway between Pavonia Terminal in Jersey City and Butler station until December 12, 1958, when the former changed its destination to Susquehanna Transfer in North Bergen. The next station eastbound was the namesake Midland Park station and westbound was Wyckoff. Wortendyke station consisted of a single low-level side platform with the  wooden frame station depot.

Interest in railroad service in Franklin Township began with the proposed New Jersey Western Railroad, a project of entrepeneur Cornelius A. Wortendyke. However, passenger service began on April 8, 1871, when the New Jersey Midland Railroad began service to Pompton Township (modern-day Pompton Lakes). Upon the opening of the railroad, railroad shops were established at Midland Avenue in the Wortendyke area. The facility included a  roundhouse and a  diameter turntable. The shops lasted until 1897, when they burned down. Instead of rebuilding, the railroad chose to move the works facility to North Hawthorne.

Passenger service through Midland Park and Wortendyke station continued on the Susquehanna Railroad discontinued service on June 30, 1966. The station depot currently serves as the home of a pottery studio.

See also 
Existing original station buildings from the New Jersey Midland can be found at Bogota, Vreeland Avenue, Butler, and Newfoundland among other places.
 NYSW (passenger 1939-1966) map
 Operating Passenger Railroad Stations Thematic Resource (New Jersey)

Bibliography

References

External links 
 The Old Wortendyke Station Pottery Studio
 Hot Dog Caboose
 Wikimapia

Midland Park, New Jersey
Railway stations in Passaic County, New Jersey
Wortendyke station
Former railway stations in New Jersey
Railway stations closed in 1966
Railway stations in the United States opened in 1871
1871 establishments in New Jersey
1966 disestablishments in New Jersey